The Investigative Journalism Foundation is a Canadian not-for-profit organization that creates publicly accessible databases about philanthropic donations, political funding, and lobbying in Canada.

Organization 
The Investigative Journalism Foundation is a Canadian not-for-profit organization that was launched on January 4, 2023. The organization is supported by donations from the Balsillie Family Foundation, the Trottier Family Foundation, the McConnell Foundation, the Social Sciences and Humanities Research Council, the University of Toronto Scarborough, and John Campbell & Denise Fujiwara. The organization is based in Toronto.

It is led by CEO and editor-in-chief Zane Schwartz. The board of directors includes Brent Jolly, (the President of the Canadian Association of Journalists), Karyn Pugliese (the Editor-in-Chief of Canada’s National Observer), Sadia Zaman (the CEO of the Inspirit Foundation), and John Ruffolo, (the founder of Maverix Private Equity). Reporters include Roberto Rocha and Kayla Zhu, contributing editors include Fatima Syed and Michael Pereira. There are twelve staff in total, eight of whom are full time.

Activities and history 
The Investigative Journalism Foundation's team, which includes over eighty volunteers and academic partners, spent two years gathering and analyzing data from government websites and organizing them into eight publicly accessible databases on topics including political funding, philanthropic donations, and lobbying.

In addition to creating and managing these databases, the Foundation uses them to develop investigative reporting in collaboration with news outlets including Canada's National Observer, Village Media, The Walrus and The Canadian Press. It published eight stories on the day of its launch, including a piece with The Walrus about the state of Canadian public housing and one investigating various lobbyists' presence at fundraisers for the Prime Minister.

Critical reception 
The Investigative Journalism Foundation was described as "Canada's ProPublica" by Sarah Scire, writing for the Neiman Lab.

References

External links 

 Investigative Journalism Foundation official website

Organizations established in 2023
Organizations based in Toronto
2023 establishments in Ontario
Canadian journalism organizations
Investigative journalism
Canadian news websites